Jo in Nine G Hell is the debut album by the Hair and Skin Trading Company,  released in 1992. It is the last album released by the Situation Two offshoot of Beggars Banquet Records. The album's title is an anagram of the remaining three member's names (Neil, Nigel, John) following the departure of 4th member Richard Johnston during the recording.

Track listing
 "Elevenate"
 "Flat Truck"
 "Torque"
 "Monkies"
 "Kak"
 "Where's Gala"
 "Ground Zero"
 "$1000 Pledge"
 "The Final Nail"
 "Pipeline"

Personnel
 Neil Mackay – vocals, bass guitar
 Nigel Webb – Guitar
 John Wills – drums
 Richard Johnston - samplers on tracks 5, 9, 10

External links
Trouserpress.com review

1992 albums
The Hair and Skin Trading Company albums
Albums produced by Roli Mosimann
Situation Two albums